The German Fetish Ball or German Fetish Fair & BDSM Convention is an annual fetish exhibition held in Germany, and known as well under the acronym GFB. The fair has been running since 2003 and has been held in Berlin, then in Hamburg, and now back in Berlin. The festival lasts for three days over the weekend of Pentecost, and includes both parties and merchandise exhibits. The Fetish Fair is the largest fetish weekend in Germany, and one of the world's largest fetish trade shows. Some international attendees make a special trip.

Mistresses of Ceremony
 2018: Myriel Monastic
 2017: Kari Berg
 2016: Ancilla Tilia
 2015:
 2014: Kari Berg
 2013:
 2012: Kari Berg
 2011:
 2010:
 2009: Tronicat la Miez
 2008: RubberDoll
 2007: Ancilla Tilia
 2006:
 2005: Emily Marilyn
 2004: Luci van Org

References

External links
 

Fetish subculture
Recurring events established in 2004
Festivals in Berlin
Sex festivals
Festivals in Hamburg